Yurginsky (masculine), Yurginskaya (feminine), or Yurginskoye (neuter) is the name of several rural localities in Russia:
Yurginsky (rural locality), a settlement in the Lebyazhye-Asanovskaya Rural Territory of Yaysky District of Kemerovo Oblast
Yurginskoye, a selo in the Yurginsky Rural Okrug of Yurginsky District of Tyumen Oblast